Pacoa is a Department Corregimiento located in the Vaupés Department, Republic of Colombia its head town is the town of Buenos Aires. After spending almost 9 years kidnapped by the Revolutionary Armed Forces of Colombia (FARC) Police sub-intendant  Jhon Frank Pinchao escaped in the territory of Pacoa.

Corregimientos of Vaupés Department